NGC 1369 is a spiral galaxy situated in constellation of Eridanus. Located about 65 million light years away, it is a member of the Fornax cluster of galaxies, a cluster of about 200 galaxies. It was discovered by Julius Schmidt on 19 January 1865.

NGC 1369 has a Hubble classification of Sa, which indicates it is a barred spiral galaxy. It is moving away from the Milky Way at a rate of 1,418 km/s. Its size on the night sky is 1.5' x 1.4' which is proportional to its real size of the 28 000 ly.

References

External links 
 

Eridanus (constellation)
Spiral galaxies
1369
013330